The 2011 PartyPoker.com Premier League was a professional non-ranking snooker tournament. It was played under a variation of the standard rules of snooker. It was played from 18 August to 27 November 2011.

Ronnie O'Sullivan was the defending champion, and he won his 10th Premier League Snooker title by defeating Ding Junhui 7–1.

Format
All evenings in the league stage featured three matches: two semi-finals and a final. All matches were best of 5 frames, with no dead frames played, points were awarded for every frame won. Meaning that the maximum number of points a player could obtain was 24 and the minimum was 0. All frames were subjected to a 20-second shot clock and there were two 20 second extensions available for each player in every frame. The miss rule was also changed; meaning that a player had three attempts to make legal contact with the ball on or otherwise ball in hand was given to the incoming player anywhere on the table. The final frame of any match was played under shoot-out rules. Each player appeared on 4 nights and were seeded to determine who they face. This was the first and only time in the events history there would be a clear winner in each match of the league phase. Unlike other years of the league phase when matches were best of 6 and therefore players could draw 3–3 on the night. In 2012 the Premier League reverted to the best of 6 round Robin matches. The play-offs were played to the rules used in previous editions. This meant that the top 4 after the league phase qualified for the semi-finals. As in other years 1st played 4th and 2nd played 3rd in the semi-finals.

Prize fund
The breakdown of prize money for this year is shown below: 
Winner: £60,000
Runner-up: £30,000
Semi-final: £20,000
5th Place: £17,500
6th Place: £15,000
7th Place: £12,500
8th Place: £10,000
9th Place: £8,000
10th Place: £6,000
Highest break (per night): £1,000
Maximum break: £25,000
Total: £210,000

Players 
Players were seeded according to their world rankings apart from the defending champion Ronnie O'Sullivan who was the number one seed.

League phase 

Top four qualified for the play-offs. The order of players was decided on most frames won, and then least frames lost. (Breaks above 50 shown between (parentheses); century breaks are indicated with bold.)

18 August – Embassy Theatre, Skegness, England
Semi-finals:
John Higgins 3–0 Jimmy White → 61–36, (105)–5, 71–69
Neil Robertson 0–3 Matthew Stevens → 18–63, 44–76, 13–(82)
Final: John Higgins 0–3 Matthew Stevens → 18–(91), 0–(95), 10–65
1 September – Guildford Spectrum, Guildford, England
Semi-finals:
Jimmy White 0–3 Mark Williams → 1–(105), 30–61, 5–82 (60)
Ronnie O'Sullivan 2–3 Shaun Murphy → 63–48, 45–71, 68–49, 6–(115), 0–91 (85)
Final: Mark Williams 3–1 Shaun Murphy → 67–(65), 14–66, 62–47, (101) 118–6
22 September – Ravenscraig Sports Facility, Motherwell, Scotland
Semi-finals:
John Higgins 0–3 Neil Robertson → 14–126 (57, 69), 0–93 (87), 35–95
Ding Junhui 3–2 Shaun Murphy → (92) 124–7, 36–(98), 8–117 (98), (87) 102–21, (80)–0
Final: Neil Robertson 3–1 Ding Junhui → 56–63, (140)–0, (109) 118–0, 54–42
29 September – The Dome, Doncaster, England
Semi-finals:
Ronnie O'Sullivan 3–0 Matthew Stevens → 70–0, (94)–0, 77–12
Ding Junhui 0–3 Ali Carter → 9–82, 14–120 (50,70), 0–92 (91)
Final: Ronnie O'Sullivan 3–1 Ali Carter → 41–54, 52–42, (68) 72–21, 36–6
6 October – Hutton Moor Leisure Centre, Weston-super-Mare, England
Semi-finals:
Mark Williams 1–3 Judd Trump → 0–79 (64), 76–14, 0–79 (50), 23–71
John Higgins 2–3 Matthew Stevens → 5–(104), 68–87, (57) 61–1, 68–67 (67), 0–51
Final: Judd Trump 3–0 Matthew Stevens → 72–43, (81)–0, 67–30
13 October – Biddulph Leisure Centre, Stoke-on-Trent, England
Semi-finals:
Mark Williams 2–3 Ali Carter → 27–69, 66–41, 45–63, (115) 131–1, 0–84
Jimmy White 2–3 Ding Junhui → (52) 87–39, (59)–66, (52) 72–(56), 24–115 (78), 20–59
Final: Ali Carter 1–3 Ding Junhui → (96)–0, 7–67, 51–72, 1–72 (66)
20 October – Riverside Leisure Centre, Exeter, England
Semi-finals:
Ali Carter 1–3 Judd Trump → (78)–0, 14–62, 16–(111), 31–57 (53)
Shaun Murphy 1–3 Neil Robertson → 37–66 (60), (53) 74–41, 35–83 (52), 49–68
Final: Judd Trump 3–1 Neil Robertson → 55–54, 38–76, 74–0 (59), 79–0 (76)
3 November – Southampton Guildhall, Southampton, England
Semi-finals:
Ronnie O'Sullivan 3–2 Judd Trump → 0–(139), (53) 94–32, (89)–22, 46–64 (58), (70) 78–4
Neil Robertson 2–3 Ding Junhui → 59–72, 14–(61), (66) 72–17, (55) 70–46, 7–100 (58)
Final: Ronnie O'Sullivan 1–3 Ding Junhui → (77) 82–0, 1–74, 58–68, 17–79 (76)
10 November – Spiceball Leisure Centre, Banbury, England
Semi-finals:
John Higgins 3–1 Ali Carter → 36–52, (101) 117–13, (79) 95–0, 67–38
Mark Williams 3–0 Matthew Stevens → 63–28, 76–5, (105)–0
Final: John Higgins 3–1 Mark Williams → (125) 130–1, 44–77, (89)–24, 69–22
17 November – Grimsby Auditorium, Grimsby, England
Semi-finals:
Judd Trump 0–3 Shaun Murphy 1–75, 0–(122), 14–111 (100)
Ronnie O'Sullivan 3–0 Jimmy White → (65) 87–29, 75–6, (103) 120–6
Final: Shaun Murphy 1–3 Ronnie O'Sullivan → 16–(82), 35–(78), (52) 83–0, 40–(100)

Play-offs 
26–27 November, Potters Leisure Resort, Hopton-on-Sea, England

* 0–66, 70–33, 109(109)–3, 34–59, 96(55)–0, 85(84)–0, 92(88)–9
** 89–37, 28–53, 15–74 (58), 68(59)–17, 139(139)–0, 69–58,14–70,75(75)–25
*** 68(52)–31, 96(92)–16, 80(56)–24, 57–43, 33–70, 79–52, 63(63)–61(60), 77(77)–0

Qualifiers

The qualification for this tournament, the Championship League was played in eight groups from 3 January to 24 March 2011.

Century breaks

 140, 109  Neil Robertson
 139, 111  Judd Trump
 139  Ding Junhui
 125, 105, 101  John Higgins
 122, 115, 100  Shaun Murphy
 115, 105, 105, 101  Mark Williams
 109, 103, 100  Ronnie O'Sullivan
 104  Matthew Stevens

References

External links
 

2011
Premier League
Premier League Snooker